Luca de Sarzana, O.F.M.  (died 1471) was a Roman Catholic prelate who served as Bishop of Cefalù (1445–1471).

Biography
Luca de Sarzana was ordained a priest in the Order of Friars Minor.
On 23 Jul 1445, he was appointed during the papacy of Pope Eugene IV as Bishop of Cefalù.
He served as Bishop of Cefalù until his death in 1471.

References

External links and additional sources
 (for Chronology of Bishops) 
 (for Chronology of Bishops) 

15th-century Roman Catholic bishops in Sicily
Bishops appointed by Pope Eugene IV
1471 deaths
Franciscan bishops